Tom "Tommy" Fox (birth unknown – death unknown) was a professional rugby league footballer who played in the 1930s. He played at club level for the Featherstone Rovers (Heritage № 104).

Playing career
Tom Fox made his début for the Featherstone Rovers on Saturday 3 October 1931.

References

External links
Search for "Fox" at rugbyleagueproject.org

English rugby league players
Featherstone Rovers players
Place of birth missing
Place of death missing
Year of birth missing
Year of death missing